These are the results of the 2002 Ibero-American Championships in Athletics which took place on May 11–12, 2002 on Estadio Cementos Progreso in Guatemala City, Guatemala. As the stadium is located 1402 meters above sea level, performances in some of the events were aided by high altitude.

Men's results

100 meters

Heats – May 11Wind:Heat 1: +2.6 m/s, Heat 2: +2.0 m/s, Heat 3: +1.9 m/s

Final – May 11Wind:+3.0 m/s

200 meters

Heats – May 12Wind:Heat 1: -2.8 m/s, Heat 2: -1.4 m/s, Heat 3: +1.3 m/s

Final – May 12Wind:+3.0 m/s

400 meters

Heats – May 11

Final – May 12

800 meters
May 11

1500 meters
May 12

3000 meters
May 12

5000 meters
May 11

110 meters hurdles
May 12Wind:+1.4 m/s

400 meters hurdles
May 11

3000 meters steeplechase
May 12

4 x 100 meters relay
May 11

4 x 400 meters relay
May 12

20,000 meters walk
May 11

High jump
May 12

Pole vault
May 11

Long jump
May 11

Triple jump
May 12

Shot put
May 11

Discus throw
May 12

Hammer throw
May 11

Javelin throw
May 11

Decathlon
May 11–12

Women's results

100 meters

Heats – May 11Wind:Heat 1: +1.5 m/s, Heat 2: +0.5 m/s

Final – May 11Wind:+2.3 m/s

200 meters

Heats – May 12Wind:Heat 1: -1.9 m/s, Heat 2: +1.9 m/s

Final – May 12Wind:+2.7 m/s

400 meters

Heats – May 11

Final – May 12

800 meters
May 11

1500 meters
May 12

3000 meters
May 12

5000 meters
May 11

100 meters hurdles
May 12Wind:+1.0 m/s

400 meters hurdles
May 11

3000 meters steeplechase
May 11

4 x 100 meters relay
May 11

4 x 400 meters relay
May 11

20,000 meters walk
May 12

High jump
May 12

Pole vault
May 12

Long jump
May 11

Triple jump
May 12

Shot put
May 12

Discus throw
May 11

Hammer throw
May 11

Javelin throw
May 12

Heptathlon
May 11–12

References

Men's results
Women's results

Ibero-American Championships Results
Events at the Ibero-American Championships in Athletics